Rowland Davies may refer to:

 Rowland Lyttleton Archer Davies (1837–1881), Australian author
 Rowland Davies (priest), Church of Ireland dean of Cork
Rowland Davies, fictional character in List of Tales of the Unexpected episodes

See also
Roland Davies (disambiguation)